U.S. Highway 52 (US 52) enters the state of Minnesota at the unincorporated community of Prosper, north of the town of Burr Oak, Iowa. The route is marked north–south in Minnesota along its independent segment from the Iowa state line to downtown St. Paul. US 52 is not signed along the length of its concurrency with Interstate 94 (I-94) from downtown St. Paul to the North Dakota state line at Moorhead and Fargo.

Route description

US 52 enters Fillmore County and heads through the same Driftless Area it ran through in Iowa. The route heads through Preston and proceeds north to Chatfield. US 52 leaves the river bluffs near Chatfield and enters terrain typical of southern Minnesota. This area is mostly farmland for the rest of the length until the route enters the city of Rochester. US 52 has a folded diamond interchange with I-90 south of Rochester, and expands to a four-lane freeway north of this junction. The roadway expands further to six lanes around Rochester, from the junction with US 63 to County Road 14 (CR 14), which is at the northern tip city. US 14 is a major route, and connects Owatonna to Rochester. North of Rochester, US 52 becomes a four-lane expressway through the farmland of Olmsted and Goodhue counties. Zumbrota is bypassed by the highway, and the route heads to Dakota County.

In October 2014, an interchange was completed in Cannon Falls which eliminated the last two traffic lights between St. Paul and Rochester on US 52.

North of Coates, US 52 enters the edge of the Twin Cities area. The route enters Inver Grove Heights where it becomes the Lafayette Freeway north of Concord Boulevard. US 52 splits with State Highway 55 (MN 55) north of there. MN 55 heads to Minneapolis, while US 52 heads to St. Paul. I-494 intersects US 52 in the northern part of Inver Grove Heights. The St. Paul Downtown Airport is right off of US 52 in St. Paul. After US 52 crosses the Mississippi River in downtown St. Paul, is intersects I-94 and follows I-94 to the North Dakota state line; US  52 is not signed along the length of this concurrency.

History

US 52 was extended into the state of Minnesota in 1934. The road replaced the former routing of old US 55 from the Iowa state line to the Twin Cities, and the former route of old US 10S from Minneapolis west to North Dakota. I-94 replaced most of the routing of US 52 west of St. Cloud, and the routing from St. Cloud to Minneapolis was replaced by US 10, US 169, and CR 81. US 52 was routed along University Avenue through Minneapolis and St. Paul until about 1995 (In 1986, US 52 on University Avenue between I-35W and the St. Paul border was turned over to Hennepin County maintenance and renumbered CR 36/CR 37, creating a gap in US 52 until the 1995 route change). West of here, it turned west onto Washington Avenue that traversed directly through the University of Minnesota and Downtown Minneapolis. Progressing further, it took another left turn at Broadway Street before eventually curving to the northwest towards Robbinsdale, Crystal, Brooklyn Park and Osseo. Afterwards, it turned right onto what is now US 169 through Champlin and Anoka thus eventually merging onto US 10 towards Elk River and St. Cloud. It eventually turned onto city streets through St. Cloud and back onto the present-day I-94 alignment.

US 52 was routed along Robert Street through St. Paul, West St. Paul, and into Inver Grove Heights until 1995; when US 52 was moved onto the nearby Lafayette Freeway. The Lafayette Bridge which takes the highway across the Mississippi River near downtown St. Paul was originally built in 1968 and was a "fracture critical" structure which was in need of replacement. Construction of the new bridge, which carries six lanes of US 52, was completed in fall of 2015.

US 52 was built as an expressway from Rochester to St. Paul in the 1960s. The "ROC52" project expanded the section of US 52 in Rochester to a six-lane freeway in 2005–2006.  Between Rochester and the Twin Cities, several at-grade intersections have been converted to interchanges since the 1990s. However, many at-grade intersections remain along this segment of highway.

In November 2013, a diverging diamond interchange (DDI), the Elk Run interchange, was completed in New Haven Township, Olmsted County, between Oronoco and Pine Island, at a relocated CR 12; in addition, CR 31 was relocated, direct accesses to US 52 from 120th and 520th streets were closed, a frontage road system was created and roundabouts were constructed on surrounding roads; the project cost was $34.3 million.

An experimental installation of Cooperative Intersection Collision Avoidance Systems–Stop Sign Assist (CICAS–SSA) was installed at the at-grade intersection with CR 9 near Cannon Falls, making use of dynamic message signs to show when it is safe to cross or turn onto the highway. A full-scale field test began in January 2010, though a previous version had also been tried at the intersection a few years earlier. This intersection was later converted to a full grade-separated interchange, with the work completed in late 2014.

Prior to October 2014, US 52 had an incomplete junction with North Main Street on the north side of Pine Island, straddling the Pine Island Township line. Southbound there is an exit to Main. Continuing south, there was an intersection with Main that crossed the southbound lanes of US 52 at-grade before crossing the median, then merging onto the left-hand side of US 52's northbound lanes; at the same intersection there was a right-turn lane to southbound US 52; there was no access from northbound US 52 to Main. Over the previous ten years, there had been 26 crashes at this junction, including one fatality. By September 2014, the Minnesota Department of Transportation (MnDOT) had decided to close most of this access, however, a permanent closure was not possible, as access to US 52 still has to be available during emergencies, such as a 2010 flood; in fact, Pine Island's exit to the south at CR 11 often floods in the winter. Instead, it was decided that a moveable gate would be placed on Main blocking access to the at-grade intersection; the southbound exit ramp would be retained. On October 29, a gate was put in place, with road striping and signage placed accordingly. During the week of May 4, 2015, the roadway through the median began to be removed. Pine Island and Goodhue County officials decried the design of the closure as "awkward", noting that during heavy snows, vehicles could go around the gate and still access US 52. The officials called for an interchange or some other solution to restore access to US 52 from the north side of Pine Island, but no funding or junction design had been identified as of 2015.

Future
Currently, the junction of US 52 and I-90 is a folded diamond interchange; as such, it is not free-flowing; four of the movements require left turns across traffic, with southbound US 52 to eastbound I-90 responsible for a 2022 daily average of 92%, or 6789, of left turns at the interchange. In the five years preceding 2022, there were 27 crashes, many T-bone, involving vehicles making the southbound US 52 to eastbound I-90 movement; in the same period, there were 25 crashes involving vehicles making the westbound I-90 to northbound US 52 movement, many of the run-off-the-road variety. MnDOT plans to add a flyover ramp to handle the southbound US 52 to eastbound I-90 movement, otherwise retain the folded diamond configuration, but with replaced and realigned ramps, and replace the I-90 bridges over US 52; these changes are to improve safety and traffic flow at the interchange. The project is scheduled to be constructed in 2024 and 2025, at an estimated cost of $25 million.

Major intersections

References

External links

52
 Minnesota
1934 establishments in Minnesota
Transportation in Fillmore County, Minnesota
Transportation in Olmsted County, Minnesota
Transportation in Goodhue County, Minnesota
Transportation in Dakota County, Minnesota
Transportation in Ramsey County, Minnesota